Orothalassodes leucospilota is a moth of the family Geometridae first described by Frederic Moore in 1887. It is found in Sri Lanka.

References

Moths of Asia
Moths described in 1887